Abdelhamid Bouchnak (born 1984), is a Tunisian filmmaker. He is best known as the director of Tunisian horror film Dachra.

Personal life
He was born in 1984 in Tunis, Tunisia. His father Lotfi Bouchnak is a popular Tunisian singer renowned Oud player. Abdelhamid studied at the Higher School of Science and Technology of Design in Tunis (ESAC) in Gammarth. Then he attended to the University of Montreal and graduated with a degree in film studies.

Career
After graduation, he became a director within the company Shkoon Production. However, initially he worked as a cinematographer in the web series Ta7ana, and the television series Hedhoukom. He also involved in short films as the cinematographer in Alliance in 2011 and then Le Bonbon in 2016. After few years, he directed the historical docufiction, Jadis Kerkouane.

In 2018, Abdelhamid directed his maiden feature film, Dachra, a horror film. The film received critical acclaim and later selected at the International Critics' Week of the Venice Film Festival. After the success of the film, he directed season 1 of the television series Nouba which broadcast on Nessma during the month of Ramadan in 2019. Then he directed the Season 2 of the same series, titled Ochèg Eddenia which was broadcast in 2020.

Filmography

References

External links
 

Living people
Tunisian film directors
1984 births
Tunisian television directors